Lantana achyranthifolia, the brushland shrubverbena, is a perennial woody shrub, and a member of the verbena family, Verbenaceae.

Etymology
The name Lantana derives from the Latin name of the wayfaring tree Viburnum lantana, the flowers of which closely resemble Lantana.

References

achyranthifolia
Taxa named by René Louiche Desfontaines